Statistics of the Scottish Football League in season 1919–20. The competition was won by Rangers by three points over nearest rival Celtic.

League table

Results

See also
1919–20 in Scottish football

References

 
1919-20